Ivan Lendl was the defending champion but did not compete that year.

José Luis Clerc won in the final 6–3, 6–1 against Andrés Gómez.

Seeds
A champion seed is indicated in bold text while text in italics indicates the round in which that seed was eliminated. The top eight seeds received a bye to the second round.

  José Higueras (semifinals)
  Guillermo Vilas (quarterfinals)
  José Luis Clerc (champion)
  Jimmy Arias (semifinals)
  Johan Kriek (second round)
  Henrik Sundström (third round)
  Henri Leconte (third round)
  Chris Lewis (second round)
  Andrés Gómez (final)
  Mel Purcell (quarterfinals)
  Corrado Barazzutti (third round)
  Pablo Arraya (first round)
  Víctor Pecci (first round)
  Diego Pérez (second round)
  Manuel Orantes (second round)
  Fernando Luna (third round)

Draw

Finals

Top half

Section 1

Section 2

Bottom half

Section 3

Section 4

External links
 1983 Volvo International draw

Singles